Adam Mickiewicz Monument is a monument dedicated to Adam Mickiewicz at the Krakowskie Przedmieście in the Śródmieście district of Warsaw, Poland. The Neo-Classicist monument was constructed in 1897–1898 by sculptor Cyprian Godebski.

History
On 13 February 1897 the Głos magazine published an article promoting the idea of building the monument. Other newspapers soon followed the idea. Writer Henryk Sienkiewicz helped to raise awareness among the Warsaw intelligentsia, and by his effort, the Russian authorities permitted the construction of the monument. A public committee was founded by Sienkiewicz, Count Michał Radziwiłł and Zygmunt Wasilewski. The committee asked people for financial contributions to help build the monument. The financial support was quickly raised and the work was assigned to sculptor Cyprian Godebski.

The monument was built on a place where several buildings, demolished in 1865, were located. From 1897 it was sculpted by Godebski in Italy. The 4.2 m tall bronze statue was cast in Pistoia, Italy. Red granite column and foundations were produced by an Italian company in Baveno near Milan. The statue shows Mickiewicz standing tall, with his head slightly raised and his right hand laid upon his heart. The monument was ceremonially unveiled on 24 December 1898 on the 100th anniversary of poet's birth. The ceremony was planned to be much larger, however the Tsarist authorities feared it could turn into a patriotic manifestation and banned all marches and speeches. The monument was thus unveiled in silence, in front of 12,000 people.

After the end of the Warsaw Uprising in 1944 it was deliberately destroyed by Nazi Germans. Remaining parts of the demolished monument were eventually transported to Germany. After the war, Polish soldiers found the head and several parts of the statue in Hamburg. Sculptor Jan Szczepkowski produced the copy of the original statue. The environs around the monument were also restored. It was unveiled again on 28 January 1950. The last parts of the monument were returned to Poland as late as the 1980s.

References 

Monuments and memorials in Warsaw
Buildings and structures in Warsaw
1898 sculptures
Bronze sculptures in Poland
1898 in Poland
Outdoor sculptures in Poland
Rebuilt buildings and structures in Poland
Adam Mickiewicz